Eva Dillner (born 5 December 1952 in Stockholm) is a Swedish author. She grew up in Linköping and at the age of fourteen moved with her family to the United States, where she stayed until she was 30.

Bibliography
Dillner, Eva (2003). The naked truth: an exercise in therapeutic storytelling and the principles involved in becoming finally free. [Bloomington, Ind.]: 1st Books Library. 
Dillner, Eva (2003). God put a dream in my heart: handbook of life therapy. [United States]: 1st Books. 
Dillner, Eva (2005). The pathfinder process: exploring the potential of organizations and relations. Bloomington, Ind. : AuthorHouse, cop. 2005. Libris länk. 
Dillner, Eva (2006). Våga leva. Eksjö: Divine design.  
Dillner, Eva (2010). Meandering mind (2., [rev.] ed.). Eksjö: Divine Design. 
Dillner, Eva (2011). Z 2 A. Eksjö: Divine design.  
Dillner, Eva (2011). Z 2 a. Eksjö: Divine design.  
Dillner, Eva (2014). Konstriket. Divine Design.

References

Living people
1953 births
Swedish writers
Writers from Stockholm
Alternative for Sweden politicians
People from Linköping
People from Mörbylånga Municipality